Benjamin Jarrod Osborn (born 5 August 1994) is an English professional footballer who plays for EFL Championship club Sheffield United. Internationally, he has represented England national youth football teams, at under-18, under-19, and under-20 levels.

Club career

Nottingham Forest
Born in Derby, England, Osborn began playing football when he joined Derby County. Having been released after one season, he joined rivals Nottingham Forest's youth academy at the age of nine. In his first season with the U18 squad, he was frequently used as a left back. In April 2012, Osborn was voted the club's Academy Player of the Year and was awarded with a new contract the following month. Following an injury to Gonzalo Jara, Osborn was promoted to the Forest first team and made his debut for the club in the Championship on 29 March 2014, playing in midfield for the full 90 minutes of a 1–1 away draw with Ipswich Town. Although his debut resulted in a draw, Osborn expressed his delight to make his debut via Twitter. After making eight appearances for the club in the 2013–14 season, it was announced on 29 April that Osborn had signed a new five-year contract with the club.

Following an impressive pre-season campaign, which included two goals against Ilkeston, Osborn became a prominent member of the first team squad under manager Stuart Pearce at the beginning of the 2014–15 season and was given a number thirty-eight shirt. In the absence of regular midfielders Henri Lansbury and David Vaughan through injury, Osborn featured as a substitute in three of Forest's first four league games and started both their first and second-round games in the League Cup. His performances led Pearce to believe that Osborn had the potential to be a key player for the club. Osborn's first senior goal for Forest was a 92nd-minute winner from 18 yards against fierce local rivals and his hometown club Derby County at Pride Park Stadium on 17 January 2015. Three weeks later on 7 February 2015, Osborn scored his second goal of the season, and setting up the first two goals, in a 3–2 win over Brighton & Hove Albion and his third goal of the season later came on 28 February 2015, in a 3–0 win over Reading. Osborn finished the 2014–15 season having made forty appearances and scoring three times in all competitions. Osborn was also awarded the club's Goal of the Season, which he scored against Derby County on 17 January 2015 and nominated for the Nottinghamshire Professional Footballer of the Year, but lost out to his then-teammate Andy Reid.

At the start of the 2015–16 season, Osborn did not feature under the new management of Dougie Freedman due to a lack of form and appeared in his first match of the season, a 1–1 draw against Bolton Wanderers, on 22 August 2015. During a match against Middlesbrough on 19 September 2015, which they lost 2–1, Osborn suffered a groin injury and was substituted at half-time. After a month on the sidelines, Osborn made his first team return on 31 October 2015 as a substitute for Chris Burke in the 59th minute, in a 0–1 loss against Sheffield Wednesday. On 1 January 2016, Osborn scored his first goal for the season in a 1–1 draw with Charlton Athletic. For his performance against Charlton Athletic, Osborn was voted Man of the Match by fans. On 16 February 2016, having made twenty-three appearances and scored one goal for Forest during the season, Osborn won the Football League Young Player of the Month award for January 2016. After winning the award, Osborn was praised by Freedman as an "exceptional talent" and "fully committed with lots of heart". Osborn later added two more goals in the 2015–16 season against Bristol City and Reading. In the last game of the season Osborn provided two assists, as Nottingham Forest beat already relegated Milton Keynes Dons 2–1. Osborn finished the 2015–16 season having made thirty-eight appearances and scoring three times.

The 2016–17 season saw Osborn switch shirt numbers from 38 to 11, which had been vacated by the retirement of Andy Reid, and additionally saw him sign a contract extension, keeping him at Forest until 2020. Osborn made his first start of the 2016–17 season in the opening game of the season, a 4–3 win over Burton Albion, which was also the first competitive match of Philippe Montanier's tenure as manager. Osborn's first goal of the season came on his ninety-ninth league appearance for Forest during a 5–2 win over Barnsley at Oakwell. On 29 November, Osborn was linked to Premier League clubs Watford and Swansea City. Shortly after, Osborn made his 100th league appearance for Forest in a 2–1 defeat of Newcastle United on 2 December. On 21 January 2017 Osborn scored the only goal of the game against Bristol City with a "moment of magic", to end a winless run of eight games for Forest that had ultimately cost Montanier his job. After Matty Cash laid off a free-kick, Osborn flicked the ball up and volleyed it past City goalkeeper Fabian Giefer for his second goal of the season. The goal was nominated for the Dream Moment of the Month of January, while Osborn himself was selected as Forest's Player of the Month. Osborn would score twice more, with goals against Sheffield Wednesday and Brighton & Hove Albion, to finish the season with four goals in forty-nine appearances.

Sheffield United
On 26 July 2019, Osborn joined newly promoted Premier League side Sheffield United on a three-year deal for an undisclosed fee.

International career
Born in Derby, England, Osborn is eligible to play for England and was first called up by England U18 on 6 March 2012. Osborn made his England U18 debut the next day, in a 3–0 win over Poland U18, which turns out to be his only appearance.

Osborn was called up by England U19 on 20 September 2012 Osborn made his England U19 debut on 26 September 2012, playing 45 minutes, in a 3–0 win over Estonia U19. Osborn went on to make two more appearances against Faroe Islands U19 and Ukraine U19.

Osborn was called up by England U20 for the first time on 20 March 2015 Osborn made his England U20 debut six days later, playing 69 minutes, against Mexico U20 and went on to win 4–2 in penalty shoot-out after game was 1–1.

Personal life
Born in Derby, England, Osborn attended West Park School in Spondon. He grew up supporting Derby County and has twin sisters, Bethan and Holly Osborn.

Career statistics

Honours
Individual
 Nottingham Forest Academy Player of the Year: 2011–12
 Nottingham Forest Goal of the Season: 2014–15
 Football League Young Player of the Month: January 2016
 Nottingham Forest Player of the Season: 2017–18

References

External links

 
 

1994 births
Living people
Footballers from Derby
English footballers
England youth international footballers
Association football midfielders
Nottingham Forest F.C. players
Sheffield United F.C. players
English Football League players
Premier League players